Ho Sheung Heung is an area in Sheung Shui, North District, Hong Kong.

Administration
Ho Sheung Heung is a recognized village under the New Territories Small House Policy. For electoral purposes, Ho Sheung Heung is part of the Sheung Shui Rural constituency of the North District Council. It is currently represented by Simon Hau Fuk-tat, who was elected in the local elections.

History
The Hau Clan, one of the Five Great Clans of the New Territories, arrived in modern-day Hong Kong towards the end of the 12th century, during the Southern Song Dynasty. They first settled at Ho Sheung Heung. They later settled three branch-villages: Yin Kong, Kam Tsin and Ping Kong.

Villages
There are four villages in Ho Sheung Heung, namely Nam Pin Wai, Pak Pin Wai, Chung Sum Tsuen and Chung Wai Tsuen (San Tsuen).

Ho Sheung Heung Lo Wai aka. Pak Pin Wai is a walled village.

Conservation
Hau Ku Shek Ancestral Hall in Ho Sheung Heung has been listed as a declared monument since 2003. The Sin Wai Nunnery and the Hung Shing Temple and Pai Fung Temple are listed as Grade III historic buildings since 2010.

References

External links

 Delineation of area of existing village Ho Sheung Heung (Sheung Shui) for election of resident representative (2019 to 2022)
 Antiquities Advisory Board. Historic Building Appraisal. Sin Wai Nunnery, Ho Sheung Heung Pictures
 Antiquities Advisory Board. Historic Building Appraisal. Hung Shing Temple and Pai Fung Temple, Ho Sheung Heung Pictures
 Film Services Office: Ho Sheung Heung

Populated places in Hong Kong
Sheung Shui
Walled villages of Hong Kong